Melcior Leideker Majefat (born 20 April 1994) is an Indonesian professional footballer who plays as a forward for Liga 2 club PSDS Deli Serdang.

Club career

PSIS Semarang
He was signed for PSIS Semarang to play in Liga 2 in the 2017 season. He made 33 league appearances and scored seven goals for PSIS Semarang.

Badak Lampung
In 2019, Melcior signed a one-year contract with Indonesian Liga 1 club Badak Lampung. He made his league debut on 18 May 2019 in a match against TIRA-Persikabo at the Pakansari Stadium, Cibinong.

Kalteng Putra
He was signed for Kalteng Putra to play in Liga 2 in the 2020 season. This season was suspended on 27 March 2020 due to the COVID-19 pandemic. The season was abandoned and was declared void on 20 January 2021.

Honours

Club
PSIS Semarang
 Liga 2 third place (play-offs): 2017

References

External links
 Melcior Majefat at Soccerway
 Melcior Majefat at Liga Indonesia

1994 births
Living people
People from Sorong
Badak Lampung F.C. players
PSIS Semarang players
Association football forwards
Indonesian footballers